Revolving Doors of Vengeance (Traditional Chinese: 酒店風雲) is a 30-episode TVB series which was released in 2005. The fictional Royal Court Hotel is based on Crown Prince Hotel, which is located in Dongguan, Guangdong province of China.

Plot summary
The story befalls the family of Wong Yuk Ting (Lau Dan) who runs a five-star hotel chain and tells of how repaying a favour turns into seeking vengeance in a twisting story of honour and revenge. Wong Kai Kit (Ron Ng) is the youngest son of Wong Yuk Ting, but his two elder brothers are not the suitable heirs to the family's wealth in the eyes of his father. Then Yuk Ting suddenly dies mysteriously and the business is strangely handed to a man named Ko Fung (Joe Ma) to head. He develops a romance with Bik Kei (Kenix Kwok), whom he meets in the hotel and becomes embroiled in a tangled power struggle with the family, including Kit's uncle Wing Fat (John Chiang), where deceit and plots unfold around every twist and turn. Ko Fung saved the business for another purpose and because of this, him and Kai Kit were always at odds. Through their many arguments and conflicts, Kai Kit slowly matured...

Cast

Ko Family
Joe Ma as Martin Ko Fung
Lo Hoi Pang as Chan Dai Hoi / Ko San (Martin's father)
Derek Kwok as Mark Long Gok Cheung

Wong Family
Ron Ng as Wong Kai Kit
Kevin Yau as Young Wong Kai Kit (Son of Wong Yuk Ting and Ho Kit Wan, half-younger and arch-foe brother of Yip and Chi, but later reconciled, Fred Cheng Wing Fat's third nephew, third cousin and secret lover of Chloe)
Ellesmere Choi as Wong Kai Yip (Eldest son of Wong Yuk Ting (born by his first wife), Fred Cheng Wing Fat's first nephew, Chi's elder brother, Kit's half-elder brother and Chloe's first cousin)
Edward Mok as Wong Kai Chi (Youngest son of Wong Yuk Ting (born by his first wife), Fred Cheng Wing Fat's second nephew, Yip's younger brother, Kit's half-elder brother and Chloe's second cousin)  
Mary Hon as Ho Kit Wan (Ting's second wife, Kit's mother, Yip and Chi's stepmother, Julie's step-mother-in-law)
Lau Dan as Wong Yuk Ting (Yip, Chi and Kit's father)
Rainbow Ching Hor Wai as Cheng Yuet Fung (Late sister of Fred Cheng Wing Fat, late wife of Wong Yuk Ting and late mother of Yip and Chi)
Winnie Yeung as Julie Yip Ju Lay (Yip's wife, divorced, but later complexed)

Koo Family
Kenix Kwok as Becky Koo Bik Kei
Bak Yan as Aunty Lan
Lawrence Ng as Koo Ka Hyun

Lee Family
Ella Koon as Lee Hoi Sum / Happy (Friend, later girlfriend of Kit, love rival of Chloe)
Bruce Li as Lee Gin 李堅
Lee Fung as Lor Mei Choi 羅美彩
Nicky Law as Lee Hoi Long 李開朗

Cheng Family
Elaine Yiu as Chloe Cheng Ho Yi (Main Villain, Yip, Chi and Kit's cousin, had a crush on Kit, love rival of Hoi Sum)
David Chiang as Cheng Wing Fat, Fred (Main Villain, Chloe's father)
Rebecca Chan as Lam Shuet Hing (Villain, Chloe's mother)

Royal Court Hotel

Felix Lok as Ng Gam Kuen (Courtier of Royal Court, Wong Yuk Ting's assistant, resigned, but later reinstate)
Henry Lo as Lau Bo Yan (head chef)
Eddie Lee as a chef
Deno Cheung as Patrick (manager)
Rachel Kan as Elaine (Ko Fung's secretary)
Eric Chung as Wilson Fong
Kwok Tak Shun as Tang Heng Kwai (shareholder)
Kong Hon as Dong Bo (shareholder)
Choi Kwok Hing as Jung Gin Fu (shareholder)
Yu Tin Wai as Poon Siu Ge
Janice Shum as Chow Siu Fong
Ng Wai Shan as Ng Pui San
Koo Ming Wa as Lan Wai Gwang (security officer)
Yip Jan Seng as Lo Chi Seng (security officer)
Lau Tin Lung (security officer)
Joseph Yeung as Raymond (reception clerk)
Jacky Yeung as Tsang Kwong Hung (reception clerk)
Karen Lee (李焯寧) as Sandy Yeung Lai Fa (reception clerk)
Chan On Ying as Kwok Kiu Yong (cleaner)
Peter Pang as To Ji Chai

Other cast

Raymond Cho as Benjamin
Nancy Wu as Maria
Catherine Chau as Cheurk Ying Nuen
Vin Choi as catwalk model
Martin Tong as James
Kwong Chor Fai as Mr Poon
Lee Kai Kit as police
Hugo Wong as journalist
Leung Kin Ping as Mr Leung
Cerina da Graca as Princess of Sultan (ep13)
Kitty Lau as Princess of Sultan accompanying (ep13)
June Chan as Becky's friend (ep28)
So Yun Chi as May Hui Mei Ching
Ling Lai Man as Uncle Dung
Suen Kwai Hing as one eyed man
Russell Cheung as Sunny
Dia Yiu Ming as Ah Keung
Reyan Yan as a nurse
Amy Ng
Wong Man Piu
Hoffman Cheng
Siu Cheuk Hiu as Chu Tao
Leo Tsang as doctor
Ngai Wai Man as accountant
Wu Kei Fung as Andy
Andy Dai as Mr Lin
Ricky Wong as Pau Gor (triad leader)
Cheung Dat Lun as Pau's followers
Tsui Wing as a police officer
Raymond Chiu as a security officer
Wong Ka Yi as Si Ying Hung
Dik Siu Lun
Wong Kei Sen as Tsui Chun Keung
Yau Biu
Kiki Ho as Lo Kei Gwun

External links
Official Website
Crown Prince Hotel

TVB dramas
2005 Hong Kong television series debuts
2005 Hong Kong television series endings